Tandjilé Est is one of two departments in Tandjilé, a region of Chad. Its capital is Laï.

Departments of Chad
Tandjilé Region